The Puji Bridge is a historic stone arch bridge over the Shantang River in the Gusu District of Suzhou, Jiangsu.

History
The original bridge dates back to the Tang dynasty (618–907), which mentioned it in the Geography of Wu. At that time, it was made of woods. In 1494 during the Ming dynasty (1368–1644), local people Zhou Fang raised funds to restore it. His deeds were recorded in the Annuals of Gusu.

The bridge was built in 1710, in the 49th year of Kangxi Emperor in the Qing dynasty (1644–1911). It underwent three renovations, respectively in the ruling of Qianlong Emperor (1793) and in the reign of Daoguang Emperor (1841) and in 1925.

It was inscribed to the Suzhou Municipal Level Cultural Heritage List in 1982. In March 2019, it was added to Jiangsu's List of Provincial Cultural Heritage.

Architecture

References

Bridges in Suzhou
Arch bridges in China
Bridges completed in 1710
Qing dynasty architecture
Buildings and structures completed in 1710
1710 establishments in China